The 2016 Men's Under 21 Australian Hockey Championships was a men's Field Hockey tournament held in the New South Wales city of Sydney.

The Victoria Under 21 team won the gold medal after defeating the New South Wales Under 21 team 2–0 in the final. Queensland won the bronze medal by defeating Victoria 4–3 in the third and fourth playoff.

Competition format
The tournament is divided into two pools, Pool A and Pool B, consisting of four teams in a round robin format. Teams then progress into either Pool C, the medal round, or Pool D, the classification round. Teams carry over points from their previous match ups, and contest teams they are yet to play.

The top two teams in each of pools A and B then progress to Pool C. The top two teams in Pool C continue to contest the Final, while the bottom two teams of Pool C play in the Third and Fourth place match.

The remaining bottom placing teams make up Pool D. The top two teams in Pool D play in the Fifth and Sixth place match, while the bottom two teams of Pool C play in the Seventh and Eighth place match.

Teams
  Australian Capital Territory
  New South Wales
  Northern Territory
  Queensland
  South Australia
  Tasmania
  Victoria
  Western Australia

Results

First round

Pool A

Pool B

Second round

Pool C (medal round)

Pool D (classification round)

Classification matches

Seventh and eighth place

Fifth and sixth place

Third and fourth place

Final

Statistics

Final standings

References

2016
2016 in Australian field hockey
Sports competitions in Sydney